Gammalstorp, Sölvesborg is a minor community in Sölvesborg municipality, Blekinge, Sweden. Between 1863 and 1970, Gammalstorp was a municipality. In contrast to other municipalities of the time (e.g. Mjällby), Gammalstorp did not have a particular administrative centre. Instead, the functions were divided between the villages of Norje and Gammalstorp.

The village has grown up close to the church, which was originally located on an island, in the former sound/lake of Vesan. Until the 1950s, the municipality had a number of distilleries

Populated places in Sölvesborg Municipality